The Christian Democratic Party (PDC) is a Christian democratic political party in Chile. There have been three Christian Democrat presidents in the past, Eduardo Frei Ruiz-Tagle, Patricio Aylwin, and Eduardo Frei Montalva.

Customarily, the PDC backs specific initiatives in an effort to bridge socialism and laissez-faire capitalism. This economic system has been called "social capitalism" and is heavily influenced by Catholic social teaching or, more generally, Christian ethics. In addition to this objective, the PDC also supports a strong national government while remaining more conservative on social issues. However, after Pinochet's military regime ended the PDC embraced more classical economic policies compared to before the dictatorship. The current Secretary-General of the PDC is Gonzalo Duarte. In their latest "Ideological Congress", the Christian Democrats criticized Chile's current economic system and called for a shift toward a social market economy (economía social de mercado). The PDC had cooperated with centre-left parties after the end of Pinochet rule.

Except during the military dictatorship (1973–1990) when the congress was shut down the Christian Democrat Party was the largest party in parliament from 1965 to 2001. In 2022 the party has faced a severe internal crisis, with many prominent politicians leaving it.

History
The origins of the party go back to the 1930s, when the Conservative Party split between traditionalist and social-Christian sectors. In 1935, the social-Christians split from the Conservative Party to form the Falange Nacional (National Phalanx), a more socially oriented and centrist group.

The Falange Nacional showed their centrist policies by supporting leftist Juan Antonio Ríos (Radical Party of Chile) in the 1942 presidential elections but Conservative Eduardo Cruz-Coke in the 1946 elections. Despite the creation of the Falange Nacional, many social-Christians remained in the Conservative Party, which in 1949 split into the Social Christian Conservative Party and the Traditionalist Conservative Party. On July 28, 1957, primarily to back the presidential candidacy of Eduardo Frei Montalva, the Falange Nacional, Social Christian Conservative Party, and other like-minded groups joined to form the Christian Democratic Party. Frei lost the elections, but presented his candidacy again in 1964, this time also supported by the right-wing parties. That year, Frei triumphed with 56% of the vote. Despite right-wing backing for his candidacy, Frei declared his planned social revolution would not be hampered by this support.

In 1970, Radomiro Tomic, leader of the left-wing faction of the party, was nominated to the presidency, but lost to socialist Salvador Allende. The Christian Democrat vote was crucial in the Congressional confirmation of Allende's election, since he had received less than the necessary 50%. Although the Christian Democratic Party voted to confirm Allende's election, they declared themselves as part opposition because of Allende's economic policy. By 1973, Allende has lost the support of most Christian Democrats (except for Tomic's left-wing faction), some of whom even began calling for the military to step in. By the time of Pinochet's coup, most Christian Democrats applauded the military takeover, believing that the government would quickly be turned over to them by the military.  Once it became clear that Pinochet had no intention of relinquishing power, the Christian Democrats went into opposition. During the 1981 plebiscite where Chilean voted to extend Pinochet's term for eight more years, Eduardo Frei Montalva led the only authorized opposition rally. When political parties were legalized again, the Christian Democratic Party, together with most left-wing parties, agreed to form the Coalition of Parties for the No, which opposed Pinochet's reelection on the 1988 plebiscite. This coalition later became Coalition of Parties for Democracy once Pinochet stepped down from power and held together until 2010s.

Transition to democracy

During the first years of the return to democracy, the Christian Democrats enjoyed wide popular support. Presidents Patricio Aylwin and Eduardo Frei Ruiz-Tagle were both from that party, and it was also the largest party in Congress. However, the Christian Democrat Andrés Zaldívar lost the Coalition of Parties for Democracy 1999 primaries to socialist Ricardo Lagos. In the parliamentary elections of 2005, the Christian Democrats lost eight seats in Congress, and the right-wing Independent Democratic Union became the largest party in the legislative body. The Christian Democrats lost its influence to the socialists after Michelle Bachelet became president.

For much of the 1990s and 2000s the party contained three main factions; "Guatones", "Chascones" and "Colorines" (lit. Fatsos, Disheveleds and Redheads).
 The Colorines owed their name to the hair color of Adolfo Zaldívar and were the right-wing faction of the party. The Chascones led by Gabriel Silber and Gabriel Ascencio were the left-wing faction and the Guatones owed their label for being "close to power" through the figures of Eduardo Frei Ruiz-Tagle and Patricio Aylwin, both of them Presidents of Chile.

In recent years, the Christian Democrats have favored abortion in three cases (when a pregnancy threatens the mother's life, when the fetus has little chance of survival, and when the pregnancy is a result of rape), but not in any other instances, and opposes elective abortion.

The Christian Democrats left the Nueva Mayoría coalition on 29 April 2017 and nominated current party president Carolina Goic as their candidate for the 2017 presidential election. The Nueva Mayoria has struggled to remain united as differences have opened up within the coalition over approaches to a government reform drive, including changes to the labour code and attempted reform of Chile's strict abortion laws. In 2020, all Christian Democrats senators voted in favour of same-sex marriage.

in 2020 the party gave its support for "Approve" in the 2020 Chilean national plebiscite

After the 2019–2021 Chilean protests most of La Nueva Mayoria including the PDC regrouped to form constituent unity and participated in the 2021 constitutional convention election (as The Approval List) and the 2021 gubernatorial elections

After those elections the group renamed to New Social Pact to participate in the 2021 general election, PDC senator Yasna provoste was chosen as the coalitions candidate, after she lost the first round the PDC supported Gabriel Boric for the second round, in which Boric won the election.

After Boric won the election, most of the New Social Pact parties supported joining Boric's government, on the other hand the Christian Democrat's president, Ximena Rincon, said that the party would be a "constructive opposition" and said that any member joining the government should have to resign to the party After this the PDC was excluded from the new coalition "Democratic socialism".

2022 crisis
The official support of the party for the "Approve" option in the 2022 Chilean national plebiscite has led a severe interal division, with various members openly supporting the "Reject" option and subsequent calls for them to be expelled. Some historic figures, like René Cortázar, Soledad Alvear, Gutenberg Martínez and José Pablo Arellano left the party by their own initiative to join Cristián Warnken's Amarillos movement. Ximena Rincón and Matías Walker left the party in October 2022 to form the political movement Demócratas together with Carlos Maldonado and others. Also in October, Governor of Santiago Metropolitan Region Claudio Orrego left the party. 

Fuad Chahín who was president of the party from 2018 to 2021 was "suspended" from the party in early November 2022.

Presidents elected under Christian Democratic Party
 Eduardo Frei Montalva (1964–1970)
 Patricio Aylwin (1990–1994)
 Eduardo Frei Ruiz-Tagle (1994–2000)

Presidential candidates
The following is a list of the presidential candidates supported by the Christian Democratic Party. (Information gathered from the Archive of Chilean Elections).

1958: Eduardo Frei Montalva (lost)
1964: Eduardo Frei Montalva (won)
1970: Radomiro Tomic (lost)
1988 plebiscite: "No" (won)
1989: Patricio Aylwin (won)
1993: Eduardo Frei Ruiz-Tagle (won)
1999: Ricardo Lagos (won)
2005: Michelle Bachelet (won)
2009: Eduardo Frei Ruiz-Tagle (lost)
2013: Michelle Bachelet (won)
2017: Carolina Goic (lost) Second round support: Alejandro Guillier (lost)
2021: Yasna Provoste (lost) Second round support: Gabriel Boric Font (won)

Election results

References

Further reading

External links

Official web site

Catholic social teaching
Political parties established in 1957
Political parties in Chile
Christian democratic parties in South America
1957 establishments in Chile
Centrist parties in South America